Fernando de Mascarenhas, the first Count of the Tower, (9 August 1651) was a military and colonial administrator and held the position of Portuguese governor-general of Brazil from January 20 of 1639 to November 20, 1639, appointed by King Philip III.

Naval history / military service 

Captain Mascarenhas participated in the naval battle of the action of 12–17 January 1640, leading 41 vessels in battle against the Dutch fleet led by Willem Loos. He mostly fought on behalf of the Spanish/Portuguese alliance.  He died in Lisbon.

Citations 

1610 births
1651 deaths
People from Lisbon
Portuguese colonial governors and administrators
17th-century Portuguese people
People of the Dutch–Portuguese War
Governors of Tangier